Loanhead is a town in Midlothian, Scotland, in a commuter belt to the south of Edinburgh, and close to Roslin, Bonnyrigg and Dalkeith. The town was built on coal and oil shale mining, and the paper industries.

History
Loanhead was a tiny village by about 1599, when it was included on a map of the Lothians.  It was granted a charter allowing a weekly market and annual fair in 1669. Coal was mined profitably in the area for Sir John Clerk of Penicuik by 1685.  The Springfield paper mill, in the valley of the River North Esk to the south of the town, commenced in 1742, while Polton mill followed in 1750.  By 1754 Loanhead was a medium-sized settlement.

The limestone industry was a source of employment by the late eighteenth century, the works being at Burdiehouse, about a mile to the northwest. The coal industry continued to expand and by 1874 the town was linked to the railway. Shale was mined between Loanhead and Burdiehouse in the late nineteenth century, from 1880 under the Clippens Oil Company of Paisley.  By this time the population had expanded to 3,250. The town was granted burgh status in 1884. The North British Railway built a steel lattice girder box viaduct across Bilston Glen in 1892, replacing another which had been designed by Thomas Bouch.

The shale mines closed in 1909 because of incoming water from the Edinburgh waterworks aqueducts. Burdiehouse limeworks ceased in 1912, although limestone was mined in the area until 1960.  The Polton paper mill closed in 1955.

Coal mining continued, with the large Bilston Glen pit being sunk between 1952 and 1961.  It was closed in 1989, and the site cleared. Bilston Glen Colliery at one stage produced 1,000,000 tons of coal per annum, and employed 2,300 men.  The coal workings stretched from Rosewell to Dalkeith. All coal working ceased following the violent strikes of 1984–1985, when Margaret Thatcher was Prime Minister.  The site is now used as an industrial estate.

Governance
Loanhead is administered by Midlothian Council, and following recent boundary changes lies in the new ward of Midlothian West, served by three Midlothian Councillors. At a local level, the Community Council provides a forum at which local views can be aired.

Economy and commerce
Straiton Retail Park includes one of only two IKEA stores in Scotland. Proposals have been made for Straiton to be further developed with new facilities including an 8,000 capacity events arena serving Edinburgh. Two hotels are included in the proposals.

The main street, Clerk Street, is busy with traffic and local shoppers. Large supermarkets such as Sainsbury's and Costco are in proximity.

A large, modern industrial estate with around 100 different concerns provides a wide range of jobs for local residents. Businesses include: MacSweens haggis factory, and Police Scotland's Communications Centre (The Force Communications Centre, or FCC) where all radio traffic and emergency calls are handled. The Pentlands industrial estate was opened in the 1970s, and a number of retail and other businesses trade from the periphery of the town. These were from the likes of Greggs to the more industrial companies focusing on welding and steel fabrication.

Culture, recreation and leisure
Loanhead has an annual gala day, also known as "Children's Day". A book to commemorate the 100th Anniversary was published in 2003. Since 2001, an annual weekend music festival, Loanhead Music Festival, has been staged. This increasingly popular event attracts a wide range of mainly acoustic musicians to the town each June, and features around eight venues. As an offshoot from the Festival, Loanhead Guitar Club meets on Wednesday evenings to provide informal tuition and practice opportunities in guitar and other instruments for over 18's.

The Loanhead Miners Club continues to be a major social and community hub for the town, and wide variety of events are run from there. Loanhead Guitar Club meets on Wednesday evenings to provide informal tuition and practice opportunities for over 18's.

Several community groups run a variety of clubs including five a side football and Girl Guides.

A small green square in the centre of the town features a memorial to miners killed in the town's coal mines, and large and popular bronze sculpture known as the Coghorn, by Andrew Burton. A small cat originally featured on the tip of the horn, but this was removed by vandals, and is yet to be replaced. A local Palladian mansion, Mavisbank House, built in 1723 but derelict for many years, featured on the BBC television series Restoration in 2004.

Education and healthcare
The town has three primary schools - Paradykes, St. Margaret's (Catholic) and Loanhead Primary.

A new joint campus for St. Margaret's and Loanhead Primary was completed and opened in March 2008. The two schools are on the same site but separate allowing the separation of Roman Catholic and secular education but children are able to mix in a range of activities.

Paradykes incorporates a Family Learning Centre and is part of the Loanhead Centre, providing school/wrap around care, a library, medical centre, early years’ provision and leisure facilities. Opened in October 2018 by Deputy First Minister of Scotland and the Cabinet Secretary for Education and Skills, John Swinney .

Transport
A new park and ride facility, provides bus service into Edinburgh City Centre, opened in 2009. Loanhead is under a mile from the A720 city by-pass.

Twin towns
The town is twinned with Harnes in northern France, which also has a strong mining tradition. The town was formerly twinned with Dalum in Denmark, just south of Odense, on the island of Funen. In the 1960s, several exchange visits between the two towns took place, but the twinning formally ceased as a consequence of Dalum being absorbed by the much larger Odense.

Notable people
Mary Alexander Park (1850–1920), artist.
George Forrest (1873–1932), a plant collector who gained fame with his expeditions to the far east, he spent a significant part of his early years in the town in a house in Linden Place, which sports a plaque marking the fact.
Sir William MacTaggart (1903–1981), artist, and grandson of the artist William McTaggart, he became President of the Society of Scottish Artists, President of the Royal Scottish Academy, and Trustee of the National Museum of Antiquities.
Charles Forte, Baron Forte (1908–2007), the hotelier, worked in an Italian cafe in the High Street, on his arrival in Scotland from Italy.
Alex Young (1937-2017), Scottish international footballer.
Ishbel MacAskill (1941–2011), Scottish Gaelic singer, born there
Gary Naysmith (born 1978), Scottish International footballer and manager who played for Heart Of Midlothian, Everton, Sheffield United, Huddersfield Town and Aberdeen. He was named Scottish PFA Young Player of the Year in 1998.
John Charles Boileau Grant (1886-1973), anatomist who trained at the University of Edinburgh, emigrated to Canada in 1919 and worked at the University of Manitoba (1919-1930) and the University of Toronto (1930-1956). He is the author of Grant's Atlas of Anatomy, first published in 1943 and currently in its 14th edition.
Karl Miller (1931–2014), British literary editor, critic and writer. He was a founding editor of the London Review of Books from 1979 until 1992. Before this, he was an editor of The Listener magazine from 1963 until 1973. Educated at the Royal High School, Edinburgh.

References

 Smith, Robin. (2001) The Making of Scotland. Canongate Books

External links

Loanhead Community Council
Loanhead Gala Day
Loanhead Music Festival
Loanhead Primary School

 
Towns in Midlothian
Mining communities in Scotland